SS&C Technologies Holdings, Inc. (known as SS&C) is an American multinational holding company headquartered in Windsor, Connecticut, that sells software and software as a service to the financial services industry. The company has offices in the Americas, Europe, Asia, Africa and Australia.

Through its numerous acquired subsidiaries, such as Advent Software, Varden Technologies, Eze Software, and Primatics Financial, SS&C specializes in specific fintech markets, such as fund administration, wealth management accounting, and insurance and pension funds. In 2020 SS&C Technologies reported in their balance sheet over $1.69 trillion in Assets Under Custody (AUC).

History 
SS&C was founded by William C. Stone in 1986. The company went through an initial public offering process for the first time in 1996. It was taken private in a leveraged buy-out in 2005 with Sunshine Acquisition Corp., affiliated with The Carlyle Group. And after some years as a private company, SS&C was taken public again in a second IPO in 2010 through a listing on Nasdaq under the symbol SSNC.

In 2021, Mammoth Scientific selected SS&C as the administrator and technology partner for its $100 million venture capital fund. The fund is for health science and technology companies. In October, Gordian Capital started using the company’s Eze Investment Suite for its trading, portfolio, and risk management services in Singapore and Japan.

In May 2022, Liontrust Asset Management extended its mandate with SS&C. The company uses SS&C’s products to manage the majority of its £38.5 billion in assets.

In June, SS&C released a new asset allocator platform for institutional investors. It was powered by FundHub and provided fund data aggregation and analysis, holdings look-through, document management, ABOR and IBOR reporting, performance management, liquidity planning, and exposure analysis.

Acquisitions 
SS&C Technologies acquired a variety of companies to bring products and talent into the company. Since 1995, it has acquired more than 50 companies.

SS&C's largest acquisition to that date was the acquisition of Advent Software (estimated $2.7 billion) which was a competitor in the financial services industry. SS&C gained a big provider of software used by 4,300 investment fund managers, including hedge funds and family offices.

On August 18, 2015, it was announced that SS&C would acquire Citigroups (NYSE: C) Alternative Investor Services business. This included Hedge Fund services and Private Equity Fund services, for $425 million.

In 2016, SS&C acquired Conifer Financial Services, for an aggregate purchase of $88.5 million. It was agreed that the senior management of Conifer will continue to lead the business.

In 2018, SS&C completed its largest acquisition to date, of DST Systems for $5.4 billion. The company also moved its New York City office to 4 Times Square, and expanded the office in 2019.

Services and Subsidiaries

SS&C Fund Services 
SS&C Fund Services offers fund administration services for hedge funds, funds of funds, private equity funds and managed account managers. Rahul Kanwar, Senior Vice President and Managing Director is a key executive for SS&C Fund Services.

SS&C GlobeOp Investor Services 
SS&C GlobeOp is a fund administrator offering financial technology products and services.

SS&C Global Wealth Management 
The SS&C Global Wealth Platform offers secured web-based multi-currency wealth management aimed to support all aspects of investment management.

SS&C Skyline 
SS&C Skyline is an accounting system designed for property management functions. The property management software can be used as a marketing platform that helps users find new tenants through common rental websites and online applications.

SS&C BenefiX 
BenefiX is SS&C's product to employee benefits data management and exchange. It is a cloud-based data exchange service that transforms, translates and transmits employee benefits data to insurance carriers and administrators.

References

External links 

Multinational companies headquartered in the United States
2005 mergers and acquisitions
2010 initial public offerings
Software companies established in 1986
American companies established in 1986
Companies listed on the Nasdaq
1996 initial public offerings
Software companies based in Connecticut
Companies based in Hartford County, Connecticut
Financial software companies
Windsor, Connecticut
Software companies of the United States